A bat-kohen or bat kohen is the daughter of a kohen (Jewish priest), who holds a special status which is governed by special regulations in the Hebrew Bible and rabbinical texts.

In rabbinical literature the bat kohen is considered unique in comparison to the general population of the daughters of Israel. This uniqueness is believed to be displayed—among other attributes—by her inherent ability to cope with above average and even intense levels of spirituality (Kedusha).

The Mishnah and Talmud instruct that the bat kohen is to be scrupulous in matters of tzniut ("modesty"), thereby portraying the values of maintaining a life dedicated to holiness and her father's life-work, and also that the bat kohen marry a kohen.

The bat kohen is entitled to a number of rights and is encouraged to abide by specified requirements, for example, entitlement to consumption of the holy parts of sacrifices, lenient specifications in her preparations for immersion (Talmud Yerushalmi, Pesachim 1) and an above average monetary stipulation in her marriage contract. In addition, the firstborn of a daughter of a Kohen or Levite is not redeemed at thirty days.

Hebrew Bible 
The initial mentioning in the Hebrew Bible of a daughter of a priest as a unique personality is at the time Joseph was ordained viceroy to Pharaoh:

Next in the Hebrew Bible is the marriage of Moses to Zipporah, daughter of Jethro the priest of Midian. However, in terms of Talmud interpretation of the Torah and Halacha, the Aramaic and Hebrew term bat kohen is used and reserved for the daughters of Jewish male priestly descendants of Aaron exclusively.

Chazal recognize Tamar as a daughter of a priest, and describe her as being the daughter of Shem, who was a priest before the priestly covenant was given to Aaron, and thus the Torah lists her punishment as Sreifah "burning"—a punishment given the bat kohen as described below.

Consumption of holy parts of the offering 

The Torah stipulates specific birthrights and unique responsibilities of the daughter of the Jewish priest (kohen). In the Hebrew Bible she is granted the privilege of consuming specified parts of the sacrifice as well as heave offering, both being perishables that carry numerous rules and requirements of purity (tohorot) for their consumption. This right is specified in Numbers;
.

The types of sacrifices the bat-kohen is afforded include the breast and thigh of the peace offering, the four loaves of the thank offering the foreleg of the Nazirite's ram offering.

The bat-kohen is entitled to offer her employees to partake in her heave offering, and, by the Law, it is permitted to bypass her father (or husband) and initially give her tithe offering and dough offering but Menachem Meiri forbids this of concern that one may give these gifts in error to the wife of a Kohen who was initially the daughter of an Israelite post her divorce, such giving the gifts to a person who is no longer entitled to the gifts.

The daughter of a priest is likewise permitted to consume the firstborn animal. Regarding the giving of the foreleg, cheeks and abomasum, there is a Tannaic dispute as to whether an Israelite performs his mitzvah by giving them to the bat-kohen. This is the disagreement between the School or Rabbi Yishmael and the school of Rabbi Eliezer Ben Yaakov.

Hebrew Bible penalty for adultery by the daughter of a priest 

The Hebrew Bible law is stringent regarding the modesty of a daughter of a priest. In the event that the daughter of a priest engages in specified immodest behavior, such as adultery during marriage or engagement eirusin; then she, as well as her father, are faced with consequences graver than those of a regular daughter of Israel. Her punishment is listed as that of sreifah "burning" (actually the pouring of hot lead down the throat), contrasted with that of a "daughter of Israel" (bat Yisrael, a non priestly Israelite woman) who is punished with chenek (strangulation), and her father is demoted from being honored with the sanctity afforded priests.

Preferential marriage 

Although basic Torah law allows for the bat kohen to marry a challal, convert and freed slave (Hebrew eved me shukhrar), the Midrash and Talmud cite Rabbi Yochanan's view that a daughter of a priest is best off marrying a priest. Rabbi Yochanan maintains that in the event a bat kohen marries a non-Kohen, undesired results for the groom are likely to surface, such as poverty or the demise of the groom. An exception to this taboo is if the groom is a Talmid Chacham

In the Talmud 

The Talmud narrates how the Tanna Rabbi Yehoshua married a non-kohen wife and then complained that it weakened him. Rashi explains that the marriage of a bat kohen to a man who is not a kohen, or a Talmid Chacham ("student"), is considered a swipe at the honor of Aaron, and Aaron himself is annoyed at the demotion of his progeny, resulting in a negative consequence.

Marriage contract 

The Mishnah and Talmud Bavli both state that the Beth din (prior to 70CE) would have overseen that the Ketubah of a bat-kohen would contract the amount of four hundred Zuz (an increase from the standard amount of two hundred Zuz) in the event the bat kohen would be given a bill of divorce, limited to a bat kohen virgin whereas a maiden would receive the standard one hundred Zuz, the increase was written as the base amount due the bat-kohen and not considered a bonus (J.Ketuboth.1.5, B.Ketuboth.12b).

The Talmud Yerushalmi opines that the bat-kohen who marries a non-Kohen receives that standard two hundred Zuz amount, as a penalty for not marrying within the greater family of priests (J.Ketuboth 1:5 p. 6a).

Rishonic reasoning 

Among the Rishonim, Jacob ben Meir clarifies that the words in Ketuboth "that which is due you" (Aramaic d'chazi l'chi) are to portray that the excess amount is not considered a bonus (Aramaic tosefet kethuba) but the base amount (Aramaic ikkar kethuba).

Also among the Rishonim, Asher ben Jehiel likewise explain that the full amount of four hundred Zuz is collectible even in the even the original marriage contract document is lost, and even if the larger four hundred Zuz amount was not written in the bat kohen'''s marriage contract all this with the intent to publicize the importance of the daughters of Kohanim.

From among the Tosafists, Jonathan ben David ha-Cohen of Lunel (c. 1135–after 1210) describes the excessive amount given the bat kohen as the rightful due to her and her family for keeping to the Torah laws and restrictions that apply to priestly families and keeping to the heritage (yukhsin) of priestly lineage. Jonathan of Lunel goes on to negate the notion that such excess would cause envy and jealousy from non-priestly families (who are not officially entitled to the excess amount).

Joseph ibn Habib justifies to excess amount listed in the bat kohen's Ketubah since it is a greater shame for the kohen where his daughter to be divorced, and the excess amount would entice the husband to reconsider divorcing his bat-kohen wife.

Shneur Zalman of Liadi stated that the marriage ceremony and feast a bat kohen to a non-kohen man is not considered a seudat mitzvah, since the marriage is one that may produce negative results.

 In Kabbalah 
Isaac Luria explains the negative aspect of a bat kohen not marrying a kohen from the Kabbalistic view, using gematria; that since the Hebrew letters K H N ( ה,נ,ך those that spell "kohen") do not have a match using the Ayak Becher formula, therefore it is best for a kohen to marry a kohen.

The formula, explains Luria, portrays that the such marriage between Kohanic families works nicely.

 Daughters of Kohanim in modern era 

There have been different interpretations in the modern era, such as the ruling of Chief Rabbi of the British Empire Rabbi Nathan HaKohen Adler in 1863 that the daughter of a Cohen may only marry a non-Cohen.

Based on the research of Epstein (1973) the recording of Four hundred Zuz in the Ketubah of the bat-kohen was well in effect during the Amora period, but from thence onward, no mentioning of the increased amount is found in Rabbinic sources.Women, Slaves and the Ignorant in Rabbinic Literature, and Also .. 2008 p114 Solomon Zucrow "At first there was no difference in the amount written in the Kethuba of one who married a widowed daughter of a Cohen, but later it was instituted that in such a case the amount should be two hundred zuzim instead of the customary one ..."

 In literature 

The expectations upon the daughter of a Kohen feature in Julian Stryjkowski's Voices in the Darkness. See also 
 613 commandments
 Bat Levi
 Halakha given to Moses on Sinai

Further reading
 Bat Kohen - The Marriage Of A Bat Kohen To A Kohen (Igud HaKohanim'', Published 2019 )

References 

Judaism and women
Jewish law and rituals
Jewish marital law
Priesthood (Judaism)